The convex-tailed horned toad (Boulenophrys caudoprocta) is a species of frog in the family Megophryidae, endemic to China, and is only known from the type locality, Tianping Mountain, Sangzhi County, in Hunan.
Its natural habitats are subtropical or tropical moist montane forests and rivers.

References

Boulenophrys
Amphibians of China
Endemic fauna of China
Taxonomy articles created by Polbot
Amphibians described in 1994